Westmeath County Council is the authority responsible for local government in County Westmeath, Ireland. As a county council, it is governed by the Local Government Act 2001. The council is responsible for housing and community, roads and transportation, urban planning and development, amenity and culture, and environment. The council has 20 elected members. Elections are held every five years and are by single transferable vote. The head of the council has the title of Cathaoirleach (Chairperson). The county administration is headed by a Chief Executive, Pat Gallagher. The county town is Mullingar.

History
Originally Westmeath County Council held its meetings in Mullingar Courthouse. The council commissioned a purpose-built facility, known as County Hall, in Mount Street in Mullingar in the early 20th century. In the early part of the 21st century it occupied a historic building on the same site associated with the old county gaol. It then moved to more modern facilities at the new County Buildings, to the south of the previous facility, in 2009.

Local Electoral Areas and Municipal Districts
Westmeath County Council is divided into local electoral areas, defined by electoral divisions, for the purposes of local elections, and into municipal districts for the purposes of local exercising of the powers of the local authority.

Councillors

2019 seats summary

Councillors by electoral area
This list reflects the order in which Councillors were elected on 24 May 2019.

Notes

Co-options

References

External links

Politics of County Westmeath
County councils in the Republic of Ireland